Spinoside is any one of several chemical compounds isolated from certain plants, notably Desfontainia spinosa.  They can be seen as derivatives of the triterpene hydrocarbon cucurbitane, more specifically from cucurbitacin H.

They include
 Spinoside A, from D. spinosa 
 Spinoside B, from D. spinosa

References